Velvet is a 1984 American action/drama TV film for the ABC Network directed by Richard Lang, starring Leah Ayres, Shari Belafonte, Mary-Margaret Humes and Sheree J. Wilson. The film was inspired by the American TV series Charlie’s Angels. The screenplay was written by Ned Wynn. The film portrays a team of unlikely female secret agents as they disguise themselves as aerobics instructors to close in on a group of criminals. 

Velvet was produced by Douglas S. Cramer and Aaron Spelling,  who has been described as “the most prolific producer in TV history.”  Spelling is known for Beverly Hills, 90210 (1990-2000), Charmed (1998-2006) and many other television programs from the 1970s to 2000's. “[Charlie’s Angels] was created by Aaron Spelling”, which is the inspiration of Velvet. Charlie’s Angels introduced a new idea of characterization for female characters with independence: “Charlie’s Angels presented women as far more tough than did shows of the past.”  Nevertheless, it was still tainted by the unrealistic depiction of picture perfect women that were tough, but also still had overly exaggerated stereotypical obsession with themselves: “Charlie’s Angels is a show that focuses on beautiful women who are more interested in wearing designer clothes than in solving crimes.”  Velvet’s screenplay aimed to further relay the idea of tough female characters in an action genre, with less emphasis on the stereotypes of self-obsessed women.

Plot
A group of four female government secret agents disguise themselves as aerobics instructors at a global aerobic center franchise. Their disguise is in order to entrap a group of criminals that have kidnapped a defensive specialist and his son. They aim to prevent the sale of the abducted father and his son to the highest bidder.

Cast
Leah Ayres as Cass Dayton 
Shari Belafonte as Julie Rhodes
Mary-Margaret Humes as Lauren "Boots" Dawes
Sheree J. Wilson as Ellen Stockwell
Michael Ensign as Stefan
Polly Bergen as Mrs Vance
Leigh McCloskey as James Barstow
Andrea Marcovicci as Erica Mueller
Bruce Abbott as Breed
Anthony De Longis as Rawls 
Judson Scott as Mats Edholm
Bo Brundin as Professor Charles Vandemeer
David Faustino as Billy Wandemeer
Clyde Kusatsu as Dr Edward Yashima
William Windom as Government Official

Casting 
Leah Ayres' career debuted daytime television series The Edge of Night in the early part of the 1980s. Shortly after, she was cast as one of the lead roles in Velvet, a beautiful, secret government agent tasked to camouflage herself as an aerobics instructor.

Shari Belafonte joined the cast after her 1982 debut in If You Could See What I Hear, after mostly a modelling-based career. Her success as a model assisted in her casting in Velvet, as the four female secret agents were described as "unrealistically attractive."

Similarly, Mary-Margaret Humes was cast after winning beauty contest Miss Florida USA in 1975.

The casting decisions made reflected the common theme in Charlie's Angels, of very attractive female protagonists.

Velvet was Sheree J. Wilson's television debut.

Production 

Velvet initially premiered in English on August 27, 1984 in color for the ABC Network in the United States. It was later released in Germany on November 11, 1995 as ‘Frauen wie Samt und Stahl’ which translates to ‘Women like Velvet and Steel.’ In French, it is referred to as 'Espionnes de Charme' which translates to 'Charming Spies.' Also released in Spanish, it was named 'Cuatro Chicas en Acción''', meaning 'Four girls in Action.'

The original running time was 100 minutes. Much of the film was shot at the Westin Bonaventure, a luxury hotel in Los Angeles, California: “a stunning image against the skyline of downtown Los Angeles.”  The Westin Bonaventure is most famous as a filming location for films Interstellar (2014) and Heat (1995). The production company responsible for Velvet was Aaron Spelling Productions.

 Music 

The music in the film composed by Dominic Frontiere (The Outer Limits, The Rat Patrol) erred a suggestive tone: "The music on the soundtrack…tells us that tampering with the national defense may not be nice, but sexism is unforgiveable."

 Reception 

 Critical response 

Bok for Variety noted; "The biggest drawback of the pilot was that the physical stunts performed by the four athletic women seemed too obviously the work of stunt people." Bok continued, "[Velvet] had the usual liberal dollops of slickness and posh locations that Aaron Spelling is noted fo...the Spelling veneer always suggests a fighting chance to get at least a moderate audience reaction, but in this instance, ABC passed on Velvet."

As Velvet took upon inspiration from the unique independent portrayal of women in Charlie’s Angels in the 1970’s, John Corry for The New York Times noted "Velvet is almost interesting here; it is showing us the ideal American woman."

Ernest Callenbach compared screenwriter Ned Wynn's work was compared positively to his successful father: "surprisingly well written: affluence, the sixties, drugs, sex, alcoholism like his father’s, done with wry humor now well in control."

 Television films for ABC Network Velvet was released as a Television film exclusively for the American Broadcasting Corporation in 1984. It followed the weekly anthology series of ABC Movie of the Week which ran from 1969 to 1975. It encouraged the saga of movies that were named 'made-for-television.' These films typically had significantly lower budgets than blockbuster films, however notable directors and producers often jumped aboard these projects to boost their appeal. Filmmaker Stanley Kubrick directed the film Room 237, which was named in the top 10 best television movies by Rotten Tomatoes for Screen Rant.''

References

External links
Velvet at TCMDB
Velvet page at Charlie's Angels Fansite
Velvet at IMDb
Velvet at BFI

1984 television films
1984 films
Television pilots not picked up as a series
Films directed by Richard Lang (director)